Joan P. Folkes (born 1927) was a scientist who was nominated for the Nobel Prize in chemistry in 1956. Along with Ernest Gale, she demonstrated that nucleic acids have an organizing or controlling role in protein synthesis. In his 2005 book, Hans-Jörg Rheinberger discussed the work of Folkes and Gale and how they revealed a connection between the levels of nucleic acids in cells and the rate that proteins were made.

Folkes and Gale were also the first to demonstrate cell-free protein production in a crude cell extract. During this work, they broke open cells of Staphylococcus aureus by vibration and the demonstrated that a template chemical existed, now recognized as DNA, that enables the production of proteins even in the absence of living cells. At the time, they called the chemical 'incorporation factors' because they were fragments of nucleic acids that encouraged amino acids to form into proteins.

Career 
She worked at the Medical Research Council Unit of Chemical Microbiology in Cambridge, England.

Selected publications

References 

1927 births
Living people
British microbiologists